Mazaalah is a village in northern Aleppo Governorate, northern Syria.

With 987 inhabitants, as per the 2004 census, Mazaalah administratively belongs to Nahiya Jarabulus within Jarabulus District. Nearby localities include Yusuf Bayk  to the northwest, and Ayn al-Bayda  to the southeast.

References

Villages in Aleppo Governorate